Nerita balteata is a species of sea snail, a marine gastropod mollusk in the family Neritidae.

Description
The length of the shell is 11.5-33.8 mm.

Distribution
Peninsular Malaysia

Habitat 
Mangrove forests.

This species can be used as bioindicator of heavy metals in its environment, because it accumulates cadmium, nickel and lead in its shell and copper, zinc and iron in its soft tissues.

References

 Hill, D. S. The Neritidae (Mollusca; Prosobranchia) of Hong Kong. In: Morton B, editor. Proceedings of the first International workshop on the malacofaunal of Hong Kong and Southern China. Hong Kong University Press, Hong Kong. 85-99.

External links
 
Reeve, L. A. (1855). Monograph of the genus Nerita. In: Conchologia Iconica, or, illustrations of the shells of molluscous animals, vol. 9, pls 1-19, and unpaginated text. L. Reeve & Co., London.
 Gmelin J.F. (1791). Vermes. In: Gmelin J.F. (Ed.) Caroli a Linnaei Systema Naturae per Regna Tria Naturae, Ed. 13. Tome 1(6). G.E. Beer, Lipsiae [Leipzig. pp. 3021-3910]
 Gould, A. A. (1847). Dr. Gould described new shells, received from Rev. Mr. Mason, of Burmah, several of which had been furnished…. Proceedings of the Boston Society of Natural History. 2: 218–221.
 Troschel, F. H. (1856-1893). Das Gebiss der Schnecken zur Begründung einer natürlichen Classification. Nicolaische Verlagsbuchhandlung, Berlin. 

Neritidae
Gastropods described in 1855